Locate may refer to:

 Locate (finance)
 Locator software, in computing
 Locate (Unix), Linux command to find files
 Locate di Triulzi, an Italian commune of Lombardy
 Locate Varesino, an Italian commune of Lombardy

See also
 Find (disambiguation)
 Move (disambiguation)
 Location (disambiguation)
 Locator (disambiguation)